Tianhe, officially the Tianhe core module, is the first module to launch of the Tiangong space station. It was launched into orbit on 29 April 2021, as the first launch of the final phase of Tiangong program, part of the China Manned Space Program (Project 921).

Tianhe follows the earlier projects Salyut, Skylab, Mir, International Space Station, Tiangong-1 and Tiangong-2 space stations. It is the first module of a third-generation Chinese modular space station. Other examples of modular station projects include the Soviet/Russian Mir and the International Space Station. Operations will be controlled from the Beijing Aerospace Flight Control Center.

In 2018, a fullscale mockup of Tianhe was publicly presented at China International Aviation & Aerospace Exhibition in Zhuhai. In October 2020, China selected 18 new astronauts ahead of the space station construction to participate in the country's space station project.

Functions and systems 
The core module provides life support and living quarters for three crew members, and provides guidance, navigation, and orientation control for the station. The module also provides the station's power, propulsion, and life support systems. The module consists of three sections: the habitable living quarter, the non-habitable service section, and a docking hub. Overall, the living quarters has a volume of 50 cubic meters of habitable space for three people, compared to only 15 m3 for Tiangong-1.

The living quarters will include a kitchen and toilet, fire control equipment, air processing and control equipment, computers, scientific apparatus, and ground communications equipment. The station has a bigger robotic arm, so it can move subsequent modules or resupply vehicles to different ports of the core module as a backup. Also, this ″Chinarm″ had modern mobility, can be elongated and features 7 axes of motion to crawl. According to the latest reports, its ability is similar to Canadarm 2.  

Electrical power is provided by two steerable solar power arrays, which use photovoltaic cells to produce electricity. Energy is stored to power the station when it moves into the Earth's shadow. Tianzhou resupply ships will replenish fuel for the module's propulsion engines for station-keeping to counter the effects of atmospheric drag. There are 4 ion engines for propulsion.

Structure 

Wang Wenbao, director of the human spaceflight agency China Manned Space Engineering Office (CMSEO), said China has established "a good working relationship" with space agencies in Russia, France, Germany and other countries.

The forward docking hub allows the core module to be docked with four other space station visiting spacecraft, including two experimental modules, Wentian module and Mengtian module, a cargo ship Tianzhou spacecraft, and a Shenzhou spacecraft. The axial (forward-facing) and nadir (Earth-facing) port of the module will be fitted with rendezvous equipment. A mechanical arm similar to the Russian Lyappa arm used on the Mir space station will be fitted to each of the future experiment modules. The axial port on the docking hub will be the primary docking port. When new modules arrive, they will first dock here, then the mechanical arm will attach and move the module to a radial port. Crew and supply ships from the Jiuquan Satellite Launch Center will dock to either of the axial ports of the module, as well as the nadir port. The zenith (space facing) port has been modified to act as the station’s extravehicular activity (EVA) hatch, as the spherical docking hub is also the EVA airlock.

The first generation space stations such as Salyut 1 and NASA's Skylab stations were not designed for re-supply, while Salyut 6, Salyut 7 and Mir had more than one docking port and were designed to be resupplied routinely during crewed operation. The TCM as a modular station can allow the mission to be changed over time, and new modules can be added or removed from the existing structure, allowing greater flexibility. It is designed for replenishment of consumables and has a service life of at least 10 years.

Launch 

On 14 January 2021, CMSEO announced the beginning of the construction phase for China's three-module space station. The core module, Tianhe, passed a flight acceptance review. This core module provides living space and life support for astronauts and houses the outpost's power and propulsion elements.

Tianhe launched on 29 April 2021, at 03:23:15 UTC atop a Long March 5B launch vehicle from the Wenchang Spacecraft Launch Site. After the core module was put into orbit, the empty first stage of its launch vehicle entered a temporary, uncontrolled failing orbit. Some concerns were raised over possible damage from debris of the uncontrolled re-entry: observations showed the rocket was tumbling, which complicates predictions about an eventual landing area, although the most likely outcome was a maritime impact. Parallels were made with respect to a previous launch in May 2020 which reportedly caused some damage in the Côte d'Ivoire. The rocket re-entered over the Arabian peninsula on 9 May at 02:24 UTC, landing in the Indian Ocean west of the Maldives according to the China Manned Space Engineering Office (CMSEO), with much of it having reportedly burned up prior to impact. United States Space Command confirmed the re-entry location.

The first spacecraft scheduled that visited the Tianhe core module was the Tianzhou 2 cargo resupply spacecraft on 29 May 2021, followed by Shenzhou 12, carrying a crew of three to the station on 17 June 2021. Tianzhou 3 and Shenzhou 13 were launched to the station on 20 September 2021 and 15 October 2021 respectively.

Dockings

Maneuvers
On 1 July 2021, the space station performed a maneuver in response to a possible close encounter with the Starlink-1095 communications satellite.  On 21 October 2021, the space station performed a maneuver in response to a possible close encounter with the Starlink-2305 communications satellite.

See also 

 China Manned Space Program
 Wentian module
 Mengtian module
 Xuntian Space Telescope

Notes

References

External links 

 Chinese Manned Space Agency website by China Manned Space Engineering Office

Chinese space stations
Spacecraft launched in 2021
2021 in China